This list comprises all players who have participated in at least one league match for Los Angeles Galaxy since the team's first Major League Soccer season in 1996. Players who were on the roster but never played a first team game are not listed; players who appeared for the team in other competitions (US Open Cup, CONCACAF Champions League, etc.) but never actually made an MLS appearance are noted at the bottom of the page.

A "†" denotes players who only appeared in a single match.

A
  Chris Albright
  Romain Alessandrini
  Ely Allen
  Chris Aloisi
  Juan Pablo Ángel
  Chris Armas

B
  Isaias Bardales, Jr.
  Chad Barrett
  David Beckham
  Benjamin Benditson
  Alex Bengard
  Gregg Berhalter
  Chris Birchall
  Emmanuel Boateng
  Jose Botello
  Tristan Bowen
  Andrew Boyens
  Paul Broome
  Edson Buddle
  Marc Burch

C
  Dan Calichman
  Danny Califf
  Paul Caligiuri
  Jorge Campos
  Joe Cannon
  Paolo Cardozo
  Mike Caso †
  Alex Cazumba
  Pablo Chinchilla
  Brian Ching
  Mubarike Chisoni
  Mauricio Cienfuegos
  Colin Clark
  Greg Cochrane
  Ashley Cole
  Joe Corona
  Laurent Courtois
  Adam Cristman
  Steve Cronin
  Carlo Cudicini

D
  A. J. DeLaGarza
  Clément Diop
  Eduardo Domínguez
  Landon Donovan
  Jonathan dos Santos
  Giovani dos Santos
  Todd Dunivant

E
  Gabe Eastman †
  Simon Elliott
  Michael Enfield
  Alecko Eskandarian

F
  Robbie Findley
  Joe Franchino
  Sean Franklin
  Robin Fraser
  Rob Friend
  Adam Frye

G
  Rafael Garcia
  Josh Gardner
  Dan Gargan
  John Garvey
  Bryan Gaul
  Michael Gavin
  Bill Gaudette
  Seth George
  Steven Gerrard
  Cornell Glen
  Gavin Glinton
  Herculez Gomez
  Giancarlo González
  Guillermo Gonzalez
  Omar Gonzalez
  Alan Gordon
  Ned Grabavoy
  Kelly Gray
  Leonard Griffin †
  Winston Griffiths

H
  Ty Harden
  Kevin Harmse
  Kevin Hartman
  Frankie Hejduk
  Ezra Hendrickson
  Carlos Hermosillo
  Daniel Hernández
  Luis Hernández
  Andreas Herzog
  Chandler Hoffman
  Hong Myung-bo
  Eduardo Hurtado
  Baggio Husidić

I
  Zlatan Ibrahimović
  Zak Ibsen
  Ugo Ihemelu
  Stefan Ishizaki

J
  Bradford Jamieson IV
  Nate Jaqua
  Guillermo Jara
  Ante Jazić
  Héctor Jiménez
  Steve Jolley
  Cobi Jones
  Jermaine Jones
  John Jones
  Nigel de Jong
  Bryan Jordan
  Juninho

K
    Aleksandar Katai
  Harut Karapetyan
  Robbie Keane
  Dan Keat
  Brian Kelly
  Dan Kennedy
  Quavas Kirk
  Jovan Kirovski
  Chris Klein
  Dema Kovalenko
  David Kramer

L
  Peter Lak
  Alexi Lalas
  Jeff Larentowicz
  Ariel Lassiter
  Jerry Laterza
  Leonardo
  Eddie Lewis
  Ricky Lewis
  Sebastian Lletget
  David Lopes
  Miguel López
  Lawrence Lozzano

M
  Martín Machón
  Ignacio Maganto
  Mike Magee
  Tyrone Marshall
  Yohance Marshall
  Antonio Martínez
  Kyle Martino
  Pablo Mastroeni
  Clint Mathis
  Jack McBean
  Brandon McDonald
  Raúl Mendiola
  Tommy Meyer
  Stefani Miglioranzi
  Alejandro Moreno
  Manny Motajo
  Brian Mullan
  Mike Munoz
  Roy Myers

N
  Paulo Nagamura
  Kyle Nakazawa
  Naldo
  Joseph Ngwenya
  Arash Noamouz
  Pat Noonan

O
  Jesús Ochoa
  Curt Onalfo
  Kofi Opare

P
  Kyle Patterson
  Carlos Pavón
  Danny Pena
  Jaime Penedo
  Brian Perk
  Alex Pineda Chacón
  Álvaro Pires
  Diego Polenta
  Ivan Polic
  Dan Popik

Q
  Santino Quaranta
  David Quesada †
  Marvin Quijano

R
  Guillermo Ramírez
  Mike Randolph
  Ante Razov
  Matt Reis
  José Retiz
  Donovan Ricketts
  James Riley
  Troy Roberts
  Dasan Robinson †
  Robbie Rogers
  David Romney
  Brian Rowe
  Charlie Rugg
  Carlos Ruiz
  Ian Russell

S
  Jorge Salcedo
  Samuel
  Wellington Sánchez
  Tony Sanneh
  Marcelo Saragosa
  Marcelo Sarvas
  Josh Saunders
  Mark Semioli
  Diego Serna
  Israel Sesay
  Andrew Shue
  Oscar Sorto
  Michael Stephens
  Daniel Steres
  Nathan Sturgis
  Ryan Suarez

T
  Bryan Taylor
  Thiago
  Ryan Thomas †
  Sheldon Thomas † 
  Scot Thompson †
  Arturo Torres
  Josh Tudela
  David Twigg

U
  Michael Umaña

V
  Peter Vagenas
  Julian Valentin
  Jelle Van Damme
  Greg Vanney
  Jose Vasquez
  Mika Väyrynen
  Kyle Veris
  Sasha Victorine
  Jose Villarreal
  Sébastien Vorbe

W
  Craig Waibel
  Kenney Walker
  Wélton
  Josh Wicks
  Christian Wilhelmsson
  Brad Wilson
  John Wolyniec

X
  Abel Xavier

Z
  Gyasi Zardes

Sources
 

Los Angeles Galaxy
 
Association football player non-biographical articles